Harpendyreus major is a butterfly in the family Lycaenidae. It is found in the Democratic Republic of the Congo (from the south-eastern part of the country to Tanganyika), Rwanda, Burundi, southern Tanzania and northern Zambia.

References

Butterflies described in 1924
Harpendyreus